Robert Hart Weeks (April 1, 1930 – October 5, 2008) was an American politician, U.S. Navy Captain, and businessman who served in the Vermont House of Representatives representing the town of Wallingford. A Republican, Weeks was originally elected to the Vermont House of Representatives in 1994 and was subsequently elected in 2000.

Military career 
At the time, he was the youngest officer ever to command a ballistic missile submarine. He spent five years commanding the Stimson, conducting Cold War strategic deterrent patrols in the Atlantic Ocean and Mediterranean Sea.

Political career
Weeks was first elected to the Vermont House of Representatives in 1994, he served as the Clerk to the Transportation Committee and Institutions and Corrections Committee. He primarily ran on a platform of lower taxes, fiscal responsibility and job creation.

Personal life
Robert married Geraldine Weeks in 1952. They moved to Vermont in 1975. Together they had five children and seven grandchildren. His son Dave Weeks serves in Vermont Senate from Rutland County.

References

1930 births
United States Navy officers
20th-century American businesspeople
Businesspeople from Vermont
20th-century American politicians
People from Wallingford, Vermont
Republican Party members of the Vermont House of Representatives